Sean Michael McKenna (born March 7, 1962) is a Canadian former professional ice hockey forward.

Early life 
McKenna was born in Asbestos, Quebec. As a youth, he played in the 1974 and 1975 Quebec International Pee-Wee Hockey Tournaments with a minor ice hockey team from Asbestos.

Career 
McKenna was drafted in the third round, 56th overall, by the Buffalo Sabres in the 1980 NHL Entry Draft. He played in the National Hockey League with the Sabres, Los Angeles Kings, and Toronto Maple Leafs between 1982 and 1989. 

In his NHL career, McKenna appeared in 414 games. He scored 82 goals and added 80 assists.

Career statistics

Regular season and playoffs

References

External links
 

1962 births
Living people
Anglophone Quebec people
Buffalo Norsemen players
Buffalo Sabres draft picks
Buffalo Sabres players
Canadian ice hockey right wingers
Canadian people of Irish descent
Ice hockey people from Quebec
Los Angeles Kings players
Montreal Juniors players
Newmarket Saints players
People from Val-des-Sources
Rochester Americans players
Sherbrooke Castors players
Toronto Maple Leafs players